Shitpyit is a village in Kyain Seikgyi Township, Kawkareik District, in the Karen State of Myanmar. It is a location on the Death Railway.

References

External links
 "Shitpyit Map — Satellite Images of Phabya" Maplandia World Gazetteer
 

Populated places in Kayin State